The lists of University of Pittsburgh (Pitt) and University of Pittsburgh Medical Center (UPMC) buildings catalog only the currently-existing Pitt- and UPMC-owned buildings and structures that reside within the City of Pittsburgh, Pennsylvania, the home of the university's and medical center's main campuses.  Although the University and the closely affiliated University of Pittsburgh Medical Center (UPMC) are tightly intertwined both institutionally and geographically, including the sharing and leasing arrangements of resources and facilities (such as Forbes Tower, Thomas Detre Hall, the Carrillo Street Steam Plant, Hillman Cancer Center, etc.), buildings primarily owned by UPMC are listed separately because the University and UPMC are technically separate legal entities.

University of Pittsburgh

The major concentration of buildings that comprise Pitt's main campus is centered in the Oakland neighborhood of Pittsburgh, however a few facilities are scattered elsewhere throughout the city, including the adjacent Shadyside neighborhood.  Along with regional campuses in Bradford, Greensburg, Johnstown, and Titusville, Pitt also has a Computer Center in RIDC Park in Blawnox, the Plum Boro Science Center in Plum, the University of Pittsburgh Applied Research Center (U-PARC) in Harmarville, Pennsylvania, the Pymatuning Laboratory of Ecology in Linesville, Pennsylvania, and the Allen L. Cook Spring Creek Preserve archeological research site in Spring Creek, Wyoming.

Table of Pitt-owned buildings in Pittsburgh
Buildings in the sortable table below are initially listed alphabetically.

Table of former Pitt-owned buildings in Pittsburgh
The following table lists buildings that were owned and utilized by the university but have subsequently been either sold or demolished.

UPMC
The flagship of UPMC's hospital network is centered in the Oakland neighborhood of Pittsburgh within, and adjacent to, the campus of the University of Pittsburgh. Many university departments, institutes and programs are housed within UPMC facilities and vice versa. The administrative headquarters of UPMC are moving into the top floors of the U.S. Steel Tower in downtown Pittsburgh. In Pennsylvania, UPMC also owns and operates facilities outside Pittsburgh including hospitals in Aspinwall (UPMC St. Margaret), Bedford (UPMC Bedford), Braddock (UPMC Braddock), Cranberry (UPMC Passavant – Cranberry Campus), Greenville (UPMC Horizon: Greenville), McCandless (UPMC Passavant – McCandless campus), (UPMC McKeesport), Seneca (UPMC Northwest), and Farrell (UPMC Horizon: Shenango Valley), as well as operating ISMETT, located in Palermo, Sicily. UPMC also owns and operates a variety of other facilities inside Pennsylvania including cancer centers (also internationally in Ireland and the United Kingdom), retirement and long-term care facilities, and community and medical and surgical facilities.

Table of UPMC-owned buildings in Pittsburgh
The sortable table below has its included buildings initially listed alphabetically.

See also

 Oakland - the neighborhood of the main Pitt campus
 Schenley Farms Historic District - the historic district in Oakland which the main campus is located.  Many other historic buildings in this district are scattered among the Pitt campus and are utilized for various school functions.

Notes

References

External links

  Financial Records Services Building List
  Allegheny County Assessment Real Estate Search
 Emporis Pittsburgh buildings
 Images of America: Oakland
 Building List

 
Pittsburgh, University of
University of Pittsburgh buildings
University of Pittsburgh Medical Center
University of Pittsburgh